The Romanian Air Force 90th Airlift Base "Comandor Aviator Gheorghe Bănciulescu" is located at the Henri Coandă International Airport, near Bucharest. The base is currently home to the 901st and 902nd Air Transport squadrons, operating C-130 Hercules, C-27J Spartan, An-26 and An-30 aircraft, as well as the 903rd Transport Helicopter Squadron, operating the IAR-330L and IAR 330M. The 90th Airlift Base is also the home of the Presidential and Government aircraft. The current base commander is General de flotilă aeriană Aurel-Cezar Stănciulescu.

In October 2004, the 71st Helicopter Squadron was transferred to the 90th Airlift Base, adding IAR-330 SOCAT to its inventory. The 90th Airlift Base has also MEDEVAC capability.

History
In 1949, the 8th Transport Aviation Regiment (Regimentul 8 Aviație Transport) was established on the "Romeo Popescu" aerodrome at Giulești. The regiment was transferred to the Otopeni airport, where in 1951 it changed its name to the 108th Aviation Transport Regiment. With this occasion, the battle flag of the regiment was decorated with Ordinul Apărarea patriei.

In 1959, the Regiment was transformed in the 99th Transport Aviation Regiment. From 1986 to 1988, the 99th Transport Aviation Regiment was part of the 50th Transport Aviation Flotilla (Flotila 50 Aviație Transport), a unit formed in 1972, and from 1988 to 1990 it acted as an independent structure named the 99th Transport Aviation Group (Grupul 99 Aviație Transport).

In 1990, the 90th Air Transport Base was formed by merging the 50th Transport Aviation Flotilla and the 99th Aviation Transport Group. The Base received the battle flag and the title of "Comandor Aviator Gheorghe Bănciulescu" in 1995. The first C-130 airplanes entered service in 1996, followed by the C-27J in 2010.

2007 IAR-330 SOCAT crash
Three crewmen were killed on 7 November 2007, including Comandor Nicolae Bucur (one of the most experienced RoAF pilots, with over 2,700 flying hours), when an IAR-330 Puma SOCAT helicopter belonging to the 90th Airlift Base crashed in Ungheni, near Pitești, Argeș County. The aircraft was performing a night training mission when it disappeared from radar. Immediately after the crash, the 90th air base detached two helicopters for a search and rescue mission.

2023 NATO AWACS deployment
It was announced on 12 January 2023 that three NATO AWACS planes were to be deployed from NATO Air Base Geilenkirchen. The planes are to conduct missions for several weeks, monitoring Russian military activity in response to the 2022 Russian invasion of Ukraine.

The first Boeing E-3 Sentry airplanes arrived at the base on 17 January.

Air base equipment 

In 2022, the RoAF 90th air base equipment consisted of:
2 C-130B (5930, 6166)
2 C-130H (6191, 7432)
7 C-27J (2701, 2702, 2703, 2704, 2705, 2706, 2707)
1 AN-26 (810)
2 AN-30 (1104, 1105)
3 IAR 330 VIP (21, 40, 55), 2 MEDEVAC (75, 106), 2 TRANSPORT (74, 77)

Stored equipment
1 C-130B (6150)
1 AN-26 (801)
3 IAR 330 Puma (07, 10, 91)

Gallery

References

External links
  90th Airlift Base on the Romanian Air Force official website
  Order of Battle of the RoAF

90